The Executive Council of Lower Canada was an appointive body created by the Constitutional Act of 1791. Its function was to advise the Governor or his representative on the administration of the colony's public affairs. It was replaced by the Executive Council of the Province of Canada in 1841.

List of Members

Notes

References 
 Les parlementaires depuis 1792, Web site of the National Assembly of Québec
 "Appendix to Third Report", in Reports of Commissioners on Grievances complained of in Lower Canada, London, February 20, 1837 pp. 122–125

See also 

 Legislative Council of Lower Canada
 Legislative Assembly of Lower Canada
 National Assembly of Quebec

Lower Canada
Privy councils
Canadian ministers
Monarchy in Canada
1791 establishments in Lower Canada
1841 disestablishments in Canada